The 2004–05 season saw Dunfermline Athletic compete in the Scottish Premier League where they finished in 11th position with 34 points.

Final league table

Results
Dunfermline Athletic's score comes first

Legend

Scottish Premier League

Scottish Cup

Scottish League Cup

UEFA Cup

References

External links
 Dunfermline Athletic 2004–05 at Soccerbase.com (select relevant season from dropdown list)

Dunfermline Athletic F.C. seasons
Dunfermline Athletic